The 2019–20 BCHL season was the 58th season of the British Columbia Hockey League (BCHL). The seventeen teams from the Interior, Island and Mainland divisions played 58-game schedules. The 2019 BCHL Showcase Festival occurred shortly after the start of the season, on October 2–3, 2019, in Chilliwack and October 4–5, 2019, in Penticton.

In March, teams began playing for the Fred Page Cup, the BCHL championship. However, Hockey Canada cancelled the remainder of the Junior A hockey season in Canada due to the COVID-19 pandemic the day the second round was to get underway. As a result, the BCHL did not award the Fred Page Cup for the first time in its 58-year history.

League changes
There were no changes to the league alignment or schedule from the previous season. The league did adopt a new rule allowing the attacking team to choose which side they want to take a faceoff after an icing or penalty call.

Standings
Note:  GP = Games Played, W = Wins, L = Losses, OTL = Overtime Losses, Pts = Points
Final standings:

Post-season

2020 BCHL Fred Page Cup playoffs
Playoff results

Cancellation of 2020 playoffs
Due to the COVID-19 pandemic, North American sports leagues began suspending their seasons on 11 March 2020. The National Hockey League officially suspended the remainder of the season on 12 March 2020, which was followed by Hockey Canada suspending all sanctioned hockey activities in the country later that day. On 13 March 2020, the Canadian Junior Hockey League, in which the BCHL is a member, cancelled the remainder of the 2019–20 CJHL season, which meant the Fred Page Cup playoffs would not be finished, and both the Doyle Cup and Centennial Cup would not be contested. It is the only time in the history of the BCHL that the season ended without crowning a champion.

Scoring leaders
GP = Games Played, G = Goals, A = Assists, P = Points, PIM = Penalties In Minutes

Leading goaltenders
Note: GP = Games Played, Mins = Minutes Played, W = Wins, L = Losses, OTL = Overtime Losses, GA = Goals Against, SO = Shutouts, Sv% = Save Percentage, GAA = Goals Against Average.

Award winners
Brett Hull Trophy (Top Scorer):  Kent Johnson (Trail Smoke Eaters)
Best Defenceman: Akito Hirose (Salmon Arm Silverbacks)
Bruce Allison Memorial Trophy (Rookie of the Year): Logan Terness (Trail Smoke Eaters)
Bob Fenton Trophy (Most Sportsmanlike): Kent Johnson (Trail Smoke Eaters)
Top Goaltender: Clay Stevenson (Coquitlam Express)
Wally Forslund Memorial Trophy (Best Goaltending Duo): Clay Stevenson & Jack Watson (Coquitlam Express)
Vern Dye Memorial Trophy (regular-season MVP): Kent Johnson (Trail Smoke Eaters)
Joe Tennant Memorial Trophy (Coach of the Year): Jason Fortier (Coquitlam Express)
Ron Boileau Memorial Trophy (Best Regular Season Record): Coquitlam Express
Fred Page Cup (League Champions): Not awarded

Players selected in 2020 NHL Entry Draft
Rd7 187: Kienan Draper - Detroit Red Wings (Chilliwack Chiefs)
Rd7 207: Ethan Bowen - Anaheim Ducks (Chilliwack Chiefs)

See also
2019 in ice hockey
2020 in ice hockey

References

External links
Official Website of the British Columbia Hockey League
Official Website of the Canadian Junior Hockey League

BCHL
British Columbia Hockey League seasons